literally means 'Bear Field'. It is a name adopted by various places in Japan. 

 Kumano Shrine
 Kumano Shrines Grand Shrines
 Kumano Kodō, ancient pilgrimage routes
 Kumano Region 
 Kumano River
 Kumano, Mie, a city in Mie Prefecture
 Japanese cruiser Kumano, a Mogami class cruiser naval ship
 Japanese destroyer escort Kumano, a Chikugo class destroyer escort
 Japanese frigate Kumano, a 30DX frigate
 Kumano, Hiroshima, a town in Hiroshima